The 1915 Minnesota Golden Gophers football team represented the University of Minnesota in the 1915 college football season. In their 16th year under head coach Henry L. Williams, the Golden Gophers compiled a 6–0–1 record (3–0–1 against Western Conference opponents), tied for the conference championship, and outscored their opponents by a combined total of 191 to 35. The only setback was a tie with Illinois with whom the Gophers shared the conference championship. The team was retroactively selected as the national champion for 1915 by the Billingsley Report.

End Bert Baston, fullback Bernie Bierman and guard Merton Dunningan were named All-Americans by the Associated Press. Baston was also named an All-American by the Walter Camp Football Foundation and Look Magazine. Baston, Bierman and Dunnigan were named All-Big Ten first team.

Schedule

Roster
 HB Bernie Bierman
 E Bert Baston
 Francis "Frank" Moudry

References

Minnesota
Minnesota Golden Gophers football seasons
Big Ten Conference football champion seasons
College football undefeated seasons
Minnesota Golden Gophers football